Sir Peter Proby, 2nd Baronet, KStJ DL (4 December 1911 – 18 April 2002) was an English landowner and bursar of Eton.

Early life
The eldest son of Sir Richard Proby and Betty Monica Murray. He was raised on the 3,700-acre family estate, Elton Hall, near Oundle. Peter was educated at Eton and Trinity College, Oxford.

Career
After graduating from Oxford, he worked for the China trading firm of Jardine Matheson for four years, traveling between company posts on the Yangtze, leaving China in 1938. He enlisted in the Irish Guards upon the outbreak of World War II, spending most of his career in military intelligence interpreting aerial photographs and interrogating captured German airmen.

After the war, Proby qualified as a land agent, and then managed the family estate.

In 1953, Proby was offered the bursarship of Eton. During his tenure there, several new buildings were erected, including Villiers and Farrer houses, and the college chapel was renovated after an infestation of death watch beetle. Proby was noted for his skilled financial management of these projects, and for his enthusiasm for new technology. After retiring from the bursarship in 1971, he returned to the management of Elton and engaged in local affairs.

Proby inherited his father's baronetcy in 1979, and in 1981, after a year as a deputy lieutenant, was appointed Lord Lieutenant of Cambridgeshire. He left that office in 1985.

Personal life
On 15 January 1944, he married Blanche Harrison Cripps, daughter of Colonel Henry Harrison Cripps.  Together, they were the parents of five children:

 Sarah Blanche Proby (b. 1945), who married Peter George Mills in 1968.
 John Granville Proby (1946–1971)
 Sir William Proby, 3rd Baronet (b. 1949), who married Meredyth Anne Brentnall in 1974.
 Charlotte Mary Proby (b. 1957), who married Stephen John Hay in 1984.
 Christine Elisabeth Proby (b. 1957), who married Christopher T. C. Dobbs, a Fellow of the Society of Antiquaries, in 1983.

Sir Peter died on 18 April 2002.

References

Alumni of Trinity College, Oxford
Baronets in the Baronetage of the United Kingdom
Irish Guards officers
British Army personnel of World War II
Deputy Lieutenants of Cambridgeshire
Knights of the Order of St John
Lord-Lieutenants of Cambridgeshire
People educated at Eton College
1911 births
2002 deaths
English landowners